The Flaming Mussolinis were a 1980s pop/rock band from Teesside who released two albums, and had a minor UK hit with "My Cleopatra".

History
The band formed in 1984 in Middlesbrough, United Kingdom, although various members had been in local Teesside (North-east England) bands since the late 1970s. The most notable of these bands was Basczax. They signed to CBS in-house label Portrait Records in 1985 and were tipped for big things. The band released five singles: "Swallow Glass", "My Cleopatra" (a minor UK hit at #79), "Masuka Dan", "Girl on a Train" and "Different Kind of Love". They also released two albums: Watching the Film (1986) and Charmed Life (1987). The band's song "Angels Fall Down" was a finalist in the World Popular Song Festival in 1986.

Critical coverage was mixed. Billboard touted them in 1986 as "a band with something new to say", and Fanfare described Watching the Film as "good noise of the post-'87 boomlet: laid back, languid, and cleaner than most",

The band split up in 1988. Alan Savage later became a school teacher.

Members
Alan Savage - vocals/guitar (Now works as a teacher)
Kit Haigh - guitar
Jeff Fogarty - saxophone and keyboards
Doug Maloney - bass guitar, keyboard programming, backing vocals 
Craig McClune - drums

Discography

Albums
Watching the Film (1986), Portrait
Charmed Life (1987), Epic

Singles
"Swallow Glass" (1985), Portrait
"My Cleopatra" (1985), Portrait - UK No. 79
"Masuka Dan" (1986), Portrait
"Different Kind of Love" (1987), Epic
"Girl on a Train" (1987), Epic

References

English rock music groups
English alternative rock groups
Musical groups established in 1984
Musical groups disestablished in 1988
Epic Records artists
Musical groups from North East England